Charles D. Mitchell (born September 13, 1989) is a former American football safety. He was selected by the Atlanta Falcons in the sixth round, 192nd overall, in the 2012 NFL Draft. He played college football at Mississippi State.

References

External links
 
 Atlanta Falcons bio
 Mississippi State Bulldogs bio

1989 births
Living people
American football safeties
Atlanta Falcons players
Denver Broncos players
Mississippi State Bulldogs football players
Players of American football from Mississippi
Sportspeople from Clarksdale, Mississippi